The former Mountain View School, now the Russellville Fire Station No. 2, is a historic school building at 109 Hilltop Drive (Arkansas Highway 326) in Russellville, Arkansas.  It is a single story masonry structure, built out of fieldstone and covered by a hip roof.  Its entrance are sheltered under a project gable-roofed porch with square columns set on stone piers.  The school was built in 1926, during a period of significant growth in the city's history.

The building was listed on the National Register of Historic Places in 1992.

See also
National Register of Historic Places listings in Pope County, Arkansas

References

School buildings on the National Register of Historic Places in Arkansas
National Register of Historic Places in Pope County, Arkansas
Buildings and structures in Russellville, Arkansas
1926 establishments in Arkansas
Schools in Pope County, Arkansas
School buildings completed in 1926
Fire stations on the National Register of Historic Places in Arkansas
American Craftsman architecture in Arkansas
Bungalow architecture in Arkansas